Beyond the Pole is a 2009 British mockumentary adapted from the cult BBC radio series of the same name. It received its UK cinema release in 2010.  Directed and produced by David L. Williams  Beyond the Pole was shot on floating sea ice off the coast of Greenland, and stars an acclaimed cast of actors and comedians including: Stephen Mangan, Rhys Thomas, Mark Benton, Alexander Skarsgård and Helen Baxendale. Described by Variety magazine as a cross between The Office and Touching the Void, the film follows the trials and tribulations of the world's first Carbon Neutral, Vegetarian, Organic expedition to the North Pole.

Plot
Uptight Mark (Mangan) and his good natured friend and follower Brian (Thomas) hope to save the planet from global warming (and maybe get into the Guinness Book of Records) by setting out on the world's first Carbon Neutral, Vegetarian, Organic expedition to the North Pole.  Unfortunately they have no experience whatsoever and after shooting their cameraman after a misunderstanding, soon find themselves in a life and death race against a cocky gay (and Olympic) Norwegian team led by Alexander Skarsgård.  Providing logistical support from the UK HQ (a caravan on a hill with big aerials) are Brian's wife, Sandra, and Mark's second best friend, Graham, a keen CB radio enthusiast.   The documentary director, played by Helen Baxendale, does her best to make sure no one actually dies during the making of the documentary, but is way out of her depth.

Cast
 Stephen Mangan
 Rhys Thomas
 Alexander Skarsgård
 Helen Baxendale
 Lars Arentz Hansen
 Mark Benton
 Rosie Cavaliero
 Zoe Telford
 Clive Russell

Critical reception
Premiering in the Best of British strand at the Glasgow International Film Festival, Beyond the Pole went on to win numerous awards on the festival circuit in Europe and the US before its acclaimed UK cinema run.  The UK TV premiere in July 2010 was Pick of the Day in The Times and The Guardian.

Home media
The DVD was released on 5 July 2010.  Currently the movie is only available in Region 2 format.  Featured extras include on set improvisation, television interviews with cast, an onset diary, director Q+A in Los Angeles and a short film from the Friends of the Earth director, Andy Atkins.

References

External links
 
 
 

2009 films
BBC Film films
2000s mockumentary films
Environmental films
British mockumentary films
BBC Radio comedy programmes
Films shot in Greenland
2009 comedy films
2000s English-language films
2000s British films